The German Masters is an annual bonspiel, or curling tournament, that takes place at the Curling Club Hamburg in Hamburg, Germany. The tournament is a round-robin format. The tournament was started in 2012 as part of the World Curling Tour.

Past champions
Only skip's name is displayed.

References

External links
 Home Page

World Curling Tour events
Curling in Germany
Sports competitions in Hamburg
Curling competitions in Germany
Champions Curling Tour events